Georgina Alice Campbell (born 12 June 1992) is an English actress and model. She won the 2015 BAFTA TV Award for Best Actress for Murdered by My Boyfriend (2014). Her other television credits include Flowers (2016), Broadchurch (2017), the Black Mirror episode "Hang the DJ" (2017), and Krypton (2018). She starred in the film Barbarian (2022).

Early life and education
Campbell was born in Maidstone, Kent to a Jamaican father, a police officer, and an English mother, a teacher. She is the second of three daughters. After her parents divorced, she was primarily raised by her mother and stepfather in Dartford.

Campbell graduated with a Bachelor of Arts in Film Studies from Royal Holloway, University of London in 2014.

Career
At 16, Campbell was scouted in the street for her first role as Lucy in the 2009 web series Freak. She had minor roles in series such as Casualty, Holby City, Doctors, and Death in Paradise. Campbell was 22 when she won the BAFTA TV Award for Best Actress for her role as Ashley Jones in the BBC Three television film Murdered by My Boyfriend.

Since 2014, Campbell has starred in the Sky 1 comedy drama After Hours as Jasmine. The first series was directed by Craig Cash and was broadcast in November 2015. She had a lead role in the TV mini-series Tripped (2015), a supporting role in the BBC drama mini-series One of Us (2016) and she appeared in Channel 4 black comedy series Flowers (2016). In 2017, she appeared in the ITV drama series Broadchurch as DC Katie Harford and in Black Mirror, series 4 episode 4, "Hang the DJ", as Amy. In 2018, she began playing Lyta-Zod in Syfy drama series Krypton. In 2019, she appeared in one episode of HBO's His Dark Materials.

In 2022, she starred in the film Barbarian.

Filmography

Film

Television

Web

Awards and nominations

References

External links
 

Living people
1992 births
21st-century English actresses
Actresses from Kent
Best Actress BAFTA Award (television) winners
Black British actresses
English people of Jamaican descent
English television actresses
English web series actresses
People from Dartford
People from Maidstone
Alumni of Royal Holloway, University of London